Ursus is a genus in the family Ursidae (bears) that includes the widely distributed brown bear, the polar bear, the American black bear, and the
Asian black bear. The name is derived from the Latin ursus, meaning bear.

Taxonomy and systematics

Extant species

A hybrid between grizzly bears and polar bears has also been recorded. Known commonly as a pizzly, prizzly, or grolar bear, the official name is simply "grizzly–polar bear hybrid".

Fossils
  Ursus abstrusus
  Ursus arvernensis
  Deninger's bear, Ursus deningeri
  Etruscan bear, Ursus etruscus
  Gamssulzen Cave bear, Ursus ingressus
  Gran Dolina bear, Ursus dolinensis
  Pleistocene small cave bear, Ursus rossicus
  Ursus sackdillingensis
  Ursus savini
  Cave bear, Ursus spelaeus
  Auvergne bear, Ursus minimus

Mating system ecology

The mating systems within the genus Ursus are primarily classified as polygynous, polyandrous and promiscuous. Both males and females mate with more than one partner and use various strategies to increase their reproductive success. Since bears are sexually dimorphic, sexual conflict is a primary driving force behind sexual selection influencing intra-sexual and inter-sexual competition. Unlike more social species bears, being solitary mammals, have wide-ranging habitats to locate potential mates.  Due to the asynchrony of oestrous phases and lengthy parental care by females, bear populations are usually male-biased, meaning that females are more choosy and males are more competitive. Intra-sexual selection is then characterized by male-male competitions influenced by female mate choice.

Mating seasons fluctuate based on species dependent on geographical location. American black bears (Ursus amercanus), brown bears (Ursus arctos) and polar bears (Ursus maritimus) all have mating seasons occurring within a three-month duration during the spring and summer months (approximately May – July), with delayed implantation occurring in late fall (November), and cubs born within the den during early winter (January). Females, on average, mate with three to four males during a mating season and mating males have more variation, mating with one to eight females during a mating season. Since reproductive success is positively correlated with age and size in bear populations, there are also males that do not mate at all until they are able to compete with larger males. There is a very loose dominance hierarchy within bear mating systems due to their solitary nature. Majority of dominance hierarchies are found at food congregations in which population density is high and individuals are ranked based on size, mass, aggressiveness and willingness to fight. Overall, dominance hierarchies have lower adaptive strategies in solitary species and dominance is established based on encounters during the breeding season.

The mating system is generally characterised by two main components, the search phase and the encounter phase. During the breeding season, both males and females expand their home ranges to help increase the likelihood of finding potential mates. Males, especially, adapt a roaming strategy, covering a large geographic range to find receptive females and tracking them via chemoreceptors. Male bears are not considered to be territorial, but they do have large home ranges that may overlap with female home ranges, giving them access to a range of 3–15 females.

Male-male competition

Males compete for females using contest competition, scramble competition and sperm competition as mechanisms for sexual selection. The pre-copulatory mechanisms, including contest and scramble competition, are conditional mating tactics that are used based on an individual's phenotype. Males that are larger in size compete more in physical contests to access potential mates, while males that are smaller or medium-sized use scramble competition as a strategy by increasing their ranges to encounter potential mates. Age and size are positively correlated and as males mature, they grow in size and experience, monopolizing receptive females. Observations of broken canines, cuts, wounds and scars demonstrate the costs associated with contests and the importance of physical intra-sexual conflict within polygamous mating systems.

There is also post-copulatory male-male competition that has been documented in species within the genus Ursus. The presence of dual paternity within a litter implies that sperm competition may take place after copulation.

Another male strategy observed by male bears is sexually selected infanticide. This results in males killing the offspring of other males to directly and indirectly improve their own reproductive success. This can directly influence their success by mating with the female when she re-enters oestrus or indirectly by lowering intra-sexual competition with other males and resources.

Female mate choice

Female choice is based on the cost of searching for a mate and the quality of a mate. Since females are induced ovulators, studies suggest that they may have control over the paternity of their offspring. This may be done through pre- and post-copulatory counter-strategies that involve cryptic female choice and sexually selected infanticide. The hypothesis of sexually selected infanticide is a female counterstrategy that can directly and indirectly improve their fitness. This is done by selecting for infanticidal males to enforce mate and offspring recognition and indirectly by mating with multiple males in order to have multiple paternity.

Within Ursus, there may be a high variation within the mating strategies observed by both females and males, demonstrating overall plasticity depending on external factors. This demonstrates the conditional mating tactics that male bears may consider based on their age and size, as well as the counter-strategies of females, including sexually selected infanticide and cryptic female choice.

References

External links
 
 

Bears
Mammal genera
Extant Pliocene first appearances
Taxa named by Carl Linnaeus